The 2022 Arizona wildfire season is an ongoing series of wildfires burning throughout the U.S. state of Arizona. 

On 20 April 2022, the Tunnel Fire, the biggest incident of the year in Arizona, burned thousands of acres north of Flagstaff. This included the entirety of Sunset Crater Volcano National Monument. More than 700 homeowners were forced to evacuate, and at least 30 structures were destroyed. A state of emergency was also declared.

List of wildfires
The following is a list of fires that burned more than 1,000 acres (400 ha), produced significant structural damage or casualties, or were otherwise notable.

References

Wildfires
2022 wildfires
Lists of wildfires in the United States
Wildfires in Arizona